Ridin' the Cherokee Trail is a 1941 American Western film directed by Spencer Gordon Bennet and written by Edmond Kelso. The film stars Tex Ritter, Slim Andrews, Forrest Taylor, Betty Miles, Jack Roper and Fred Burns. The film was released on February 25, 1941, by Monogram Pictures.

Plot

Cast          
Tex Ritter as Tex Ritter
Slim Andrews as Slim
Forrest Taylor as Brad Craven
Betty Miles as Ruth Wyatt
Jack Roper as Squint 
Fred Burns as Wyatt 
Nolan Willis as Dirk Fargo 
Gene Alsace as Bat
Bob Card as Captain Wallace
Chick Hannan as Blackie 
Jack Gillette as Tennessee Rambler Fiddle Player
Harry Blair as Tennessee Rambler Guitar Player
'Happy Tex' Martin as Tennessee Rambler Banjo Player
Cecil Campbell as Tennessee Rambler Steel Guitar Player
Kid Clark as Tennessee Rambler Accordion Player
Snub Pollard as Saloon Drunk (uncredited)

References

External links
 

1941 films
1940s English-language films
American Western (genre) films
1941 Western (genre) films
Monogram Pictures films
Films directed by Spencer Gordon Bennet
American black-and-white films
1940s American films